Arnold Whitworth Boyd MC, MA, FZS, FRES, MBOU (20 January 1885 – 16 October 1959) was an ornithologist and naturalist from Altrincham, Cheshire, England.

Boyd was born on 20 January 1885. He was a long-time contributor to The Guardian 's "Country Diary" column, taking over a slot from his friend Thomas Coward in 1933, on the latter's death. In 1950, he revised Coward's The Birds of the British Isles and their Eggs for a new edition.

Boyd was uncle to James Fisher, who also became a leading ornithologist and natural history writer and broadcaster. Following Fisher's death, many of Boyd's diaries, other papers and related material were acquired by Liverpool Museum.

He made occasional radio appearances, such as a 1936 episode of My Week-End out of Doors on 'Cheshire Meres', and a 1957 Birds In Britain episode on great crested grebes, edited and introduced by his nephew James and produced by Winwood Reade.

Boyd died in Northwich, Cheshire on 16 October 1959.

See also 
 New Naturalist

Bibliography

Articles

References

Biography of Thomas Coward
Folkplay

English nature writers
English ornithologists
Fellows of the Royal Entomological Society
Fellows of the Zoological Society of London
People from Altrincham
1885 births
1959 deaths
New Naturalist writers
20th-century British zoologists